Farm to Market Roads in Texas are owned and maintained by the Texas Department of Transportation (TxDOT).

FM 3200

FM 3201

FM 3202

FM 3203

FM 3204

FM 3204 (1970)

The original FM 3204 was designated on May 7, 1970, from the Carson County line south  to US 287. FM 3204 was cancelled on November 30, 1971, and became a portion of FM 2373.

FM 3205

FM 3206

FM 3207

FM 3208

FM 3209

FM 3210

FM 3211

Farm to Market Road 3211 (FM 3211) is located in Hunt County. It runs from Spur 1570 to FM 36.

FM 3211 was designated on May 25, 1976, from SH 66 westward . On September 29, 1977, the road was extended west  to FM 36. In December 2018, when Spur 1570 was built, the section from Spur 1570 east was cancelled, with one part being obliterated, truncating the eastern terminus to Spur 1570.

FM 3211 (1971)

The original FM 3211 was designated on November 5, 1971, from I-35W in Alvarado west  miles to a road intersection at Lake Alvarado. FM 3211 was cancelled on January 2, 1976, and became a portion of FM 3136.

FM 3212

FM 3213

FM 3214

FM 3215

FM 3216

FM 3217

FM 3218

FM 3219

Farm to Market Road 3219 (FM 3219) is located in Bell County.

FM 3219 begins at an intersection with Business US 190 in Harker Heights, with the road continuing south as Lookout Ridge Boulevard. The highway crosses over the South Nolan Creek before leaving Harker Heights. FM 3219 travels in a northeast direction before ending at an intersection with FM 439 just east of Killeen.

FM 3219 was designated on November 5, 1971, running northward from US 190 (current Business US 190) to FM 439. On June 27, 1995, the route was redesignated Urban Road 3219 (UR 3219). The designation reverted to FM 3219 with the elimination of the Urban Road system on November 15, 2018.

FM 3220

FM 3221

FM 3222

FM 3223

Farm to Market Road 3223 (FM 3223) is located in Waco. The highway is known locally as Imperial Drive.

FM 3223 begins at an intersection with FM 1695 (Hewitt Drive) and travels through an industrialized area on the city's south side. The highway ends at an intersection with the southbound frontage road of SH 6.

FM 3223 was designated on November 5, 1971, along the current route. The route was redesignated Urban Road 3223 (UR 3223) in 1995. The designation reverted to FM 3223 with the elimination of the Urban Road system on November 15, 2018.

FM 3224

FM 3225

FM 3226

FM 3227

FM 3228

FM 3229

FM 3230

FM 3231

FM 3231 (1971)

The highway was cancelled on November 8, 1977, with the highway being combined with FM 1645.

RM 3232

FM 3233

FM 3234

RM 3235

FM 3235 (1971–1973)

On September 20, 1973, FM 3235 was cancelled and became a portion of FM 2146.

FM 3236

RM 3236 (1971–1972)

On August 29, 1972, RM 3236 was cancelled and transferred to RM 690.

RM 3237

RM 3238

Ranch to Market Road 3238 (RM 3238) is a  roadway located in Travis County. It is known locally as Hamilton Pool Road. Hamilton Pool Road straddles Hamilton Creek, near the Hays County line. The route travels east and northeast before ending at a junction with SH 71 in Bee Cave.

RM 3238 was designated on November 5, 1971; its eastern terminus has always been SH 71. It originally went west 5.5 miles from SH 71. The route was extended to the west 1.5 miles on September 29, 1977, and again on April 30, 1987, to include the intersection with RM 12.

Junction list

FM 3239

FM 3240

Farm to Market Road 3240 (FM 3240) is located in Bandera County in the Texas Hill Country.

FM 3240 begins at an intersection with RM 2828 northwest of Peaceful Valley Road. The highway travels in a generally southeast direction through hilly terrain and turns more in a southward direction at Sparrow Hawk Lane. FM 3240 turns to the south at Timber Lane before turning back at Dallas Street. The highway passes near a subdivision before ending at an intersection with SH 173 just north of Bandera; the road continues east past SH 173 as Bandera Boulevard.

FM 3240 was designated on July 31, 1972, from FM 689 (now SH 173) to a point  to the northwest. On September 5, 1973, the highway was extended further northwest to RM 2828, bringing FM 3240 to its current route.

Junction list

FM 3241

Farm to Market Road 3241 (FM 3241) was located in Jim Wells County. No highway currently uses the FM 3241 designation.

The highway was designated on November 5, 1971, from a county road east  to SH 359. The highway was cancelled on March 30, 1987; 1.9 miles were transferred to FM 3376 and the reminder was removed altogether.

FM 3242

FM 3243

FM 3244

FM 3245

FM 3246

FM 3247

FM 3248

Farm to Market Road 3248 (FM 3248) runs around the western and northern portions of Brownsville. FM 3248 begins at an intersection with US 281 in Brownsville, heading north on West Alton Gloor Boulevard, a five-lane road with a center left-turn lane. The road heads through residential neighborhoods before becoming a two-lane road and running between woodland within the Lower Rio Grande Valley National Wildlife Refuge to the west and businesses to the east. The highway turns east-northeast and runs through more residential and commercial areas, crossing a Union Pacific railroad line. FM 3248 heads into commercial areas as a five-lane road with a center left-turn lane and comes to an interchange with I-69E/US 77/US 83. Past this interchange, the road becomes East Alton Gloor Boulevard and continues into areas of residential neighborhoods and businesses. The highway intersects FM 1847 and becomes two-lane Dr. Hugh Emerson Boulevard, heading into unincorporated areas and passing through farmland with some homes. FM 3248 crosses back into Brownsville and comes to its eastern terminus at FM 511.

FM 3248 was designated on November 5, 1971, from what is now I-69E/US 77/US 83 southwestward to US 281. On September 5, 1973, it was extended eastward to its intersection with FM 1847, and again extended eastward on September 26, 1979, to its intersection with FM 511. The portion west of FM 1847 was redesignated Urban Road 3248 (UR 3248) on June 27, 1995. The designation of this section reverted to FM 3248 with the elimination of the Urban Road system on November 15, 2018.

Junction list

FM 3249

FM 3250

FM 3251

FM 3251 (1971)

The first use of the FM 3251 designation was in Willacy, Cameron, and Hidalgo counties, from FM 491 south  to FM 2629. FM 3251 was cancelled on September 24, 1973, and became a portion of FM 1425.

FM 3251 (1974)

The next use of the FM 3251 designation was in McLennan County, from I-35 north of Lorena to a point . FM 3251 was cancelled on August 18, 1980, and became a portion of FM 2837.

FM 3252

FM 3253

FM 3254

FM 3255

Farm to Market Road 3255 (FM 3255) is located in the city of El Paso. The highway runs parallel to Franklin Mountains State Park for its entire length. It is known locally as Martin Luther King Jr. Boulevard.

FM 3255 begins at a junction with US 54 near a retail center and runs near a large subdivision before the route becomes more rural. The highway runs near the Franklin Mountains before ending at the New Mexico state line.

FM 3255 was designated on November 5, 1971, along the current route. The section of highway between US 54 and FM 2529 was redesignated Urban Road 3255 (UR 3255) on June 27, 1995. The designation reverted to FM 3255 with the elimination of the Urban Road system on November 15, 2018.

Junction list

FM 3256

FM 3257

FM 3258

FM 3259

RM 3260

FM 3261

Farm to Market Road 3261 (FM 3261) is located in the South Plains region, traveling through Terry and Hockley counties.

FM 3261 begins at an intersection with US 385 between Brownfield and Levelland in rural Terry County. The highway starts out traveling in a northeast direction before turning north at a county road. FM 3261 enters into Hockley County and has an overlap with FM 41 then has an overlap with FM 1585. The highway travels through mostly rural areas, with the northern section seeing some development near the town of Levelland. FM 3261 ends at an intersection with SH 114 between Levelland and Opdyke West. Despite not running inside the city limits, FM 3261 near Levelland is locally known as H. Moreland Road.

The highway was extended  northward to SH 116 (now SH 114) on November 25, 1975.

Junction list

FM 3262

FM 3263

FM 3264

FM 3264 (1972)

The original FM 3264 was designated on November 3, 1972, from US 190, 1.5 miles west of FM 1670, southeast  to FM 594 (now Loop 121). FM 3264 was cancelled on August 18, 1975, and removed from the highway system; funds released were used towards other FM road projects in the county.

FM 3265

FM 3266

FM 3267

FM 3268

FM 3269

FM 3269 (1972)

FM 3269 was cancelled on May 7, 1974, and removed from the highway system because the county could not acquire right-of-way for the route; FM 3288 was created instead.

FM 3270

FM 3271

FM 3272

Farm to Market Road 3272 (FM 3272), known locally as White Oak Road, runs from US 80 north to FM 2275 in White Oak.

FM 3272 was designated on November 3, 1972, from US 80 north . On October 21, 1981, the designation was extended north to FM 2275. On June 27, 1995, the route was redesignated Urban Road 3272 (UR 3272). The designation reverted to FM 3272 with the elimination of the Urban Road system on November 15, 2018.

RM 3273

FM 3274

FM 3274 (1972)

The original FM 3274 was designated on November 3, 1972, from FM 2088, 4.4 miles east of FM 312, southeast  to a road intersection. FM 3274 was cancelled on June 7, 1974, and became a portion of FM 2910 (now FM 2869).

FM 3275

FM 3276

FM 3277

FM 3278

FM 3279

FM 3280

FM 3281

FM 3281 (1972)

The first use of the FM 3281 designation was in Fayette County, from FM 954 northeast  to the Austin County line, 0.5 mile southwest of Shelby. FM 3281 was cancelled on September 21, 1973, and became a portion of FM 389.

FM 3281 (1974)

The next use of the FM 3281 designation was in Van Zandt County, from US 80 southeast  to FM 47, 1.1 miles southwest of Wills Point. FM 3281 was cancelled on February 27, 1979, by request of county officials.

FM 3282

FM 3283

FM 3284

FM 3285

FM 3286

FM 3287

FM 3288

Farm to Market Road 3288 (FM 3288) is located in east-central Cherokee County.

FM 3288 begins at an intersection with FM 2274, heading east before turning to the south. It runs along the western shore of Lake Striker, turning into CR 4413 farther to the south.

FM 3288 was designated on May 7, 1974, along the current route.

FM 3288 (1972)

A previous route numbered FM 3288 was designated in Titus County on November 3, 1972, running  from Hickory Hill to SH 11. This route was cancelled on September 21, 1973, and transferred to FM 1735.

FM 3289

Farm to Market Road 3289 (FM 3289) was designated on November 3, 1972, from US 69/US 96/US 287, 3.5 miles northwest of FM 365, southwest  to West Port Arthur Road (now Spur 93). On January 30, 1990, FM 3289 was cancelled as the proposed prison it was to serve was never built.

FM 3290

FM 3291

FM 3292

FM 3293

FM 3294

FM 3295

RM 3296

FM 3297

FM 3298

FM 3299

Notes

References

+32
Farm to market roads 3200
Farm to Market Roads 3200